Hypoglycin may refer to:

 Hypoglycin A
 Hypoglycin B